The 1996 IBF World Junior Championships was an international badminton tournament held in Silkeborg, Denmark from 19-24 November 1996.

Individual competition

Medalists

Results

Boys' singles

Girls' singles

Boys' doubles

Girls' doubles

Mixed doubles

Medal account

References

External links
World Junior Championships at Badminton.de

BWF World Junior Championships
World Junior Championships, 1996
Badminton tournaments in Denmark
1996 in Danish sport
International sports competitions hosted by Denmark